Salpingoecidae is a family of Choanoflagellates.

References

External links 
 

 

Choanoflagellatea
Opisthokont families